Andrei Vladimirovich Skabelka (born January 20, 1971) is a Belarusian ice hockey coach and former player.  He is currently head coach with Barys Nur-Sultan of the Kontinental Hockey League (KHL).

Skabelka was the head coach of the Belarus men's national ice hockey team at the 2013 IIHF World Championship.

Career statistics

Regular season and playoffs

International

External links

1971 births
Living people
Ak Bars Kazan players
Amur Khabarovsk players
Belarusian ice hockey right wingers
HC CSKA Moscow players
HC Dinamo Minsk players
HC Lada Togliatti players
HC Sibir Novosibirsk players
Kazakhstan men's national ice hockey team coaches
Lokomotiv Yaroslavl players
Salavat Yulaev Ufa players
Soviet ice hockey right wingers
Ice hockey people from Minsk
Tivali Minsk players
Yunost Minsk players
Ice hockey players at the 1998 Winter Olympics
Ice hockey players at the 2002 Winter Olympics
Olympic ice hockey players of Belarus